Chip Oliver (born April 24, 1944) is a former American football linebacker. He played for the Oakland Raiders from 1968 to 1969. He left the team to join One World Family of the Messiah's World Crusade, he wanted to but was unable to return to the team in 1971. 

in 1971 Oliver tried to get back on the Raider team,  by standing and walking on his hands. He had been on a vegetarian diet. Aside from his affiliation with his religious group, it just was not Madden’s choice. Why another team did not show interest is a question.

Oliver played the son-in-law Richard in "Those Were the Days," a 1969 television pilot which was the second attempt to start a sitcom eventually titled All in the Family.

Oliver was also the author of the 1971 book High for the Game: From Football Gladiator to Hippie, a Former Southern Cal and Oakland Raider Linebacker Tells All. In a commentary on the book, Todd Tobias says "Oliver blasts professional football for treating players as pieces of meat, pumping them full of pain-numbing drugs and amphetamines, and then discarding them like common garbage when they can no longer sustain high levels of play on the field. In a way, Oliver was ahead of his time in his beliefs, and willingness to vocalize them." But that Oliver "loses vast amounts of credibility when he describes attending practices high on mescaline, advocates the use of LSD, and talks about smoking enormous amounts of marijuana."

References

1944 births
Living people
American football linebackers
USC Trojans football players
Oakland Raiders players